Pasundan derby is a Indonesia football match between Persib Bandung against Persikabo 1973, the main club from West Java competing in Liga 1. The name Pasundan is taken from the historical and cultural similarities of the two teams.

This match was a rivalry for a long time and then met the highest division which started in the 2019 Liga 1 season. Part of the game is because the club has played in the top division.

History
Persib Bandung and Persikabo 1973 had actually never met since the Perserikatan era, at that time Persikabo competed in the second or third caste in Indonesian football competition while Persib Bandung was in the highest caste which made the match not happen.
 
Then, only in the Indonesian League era which began in 2017, Persikabo Bogor merged with PS Tira in 2019 and formed a new name, PS Tira Persikabo, in 2020 PS Tira Persikabo again changed its name to Persikabo 1973.
 
In the first meeting between Persib and Tira Persikabo in the group phase 2019 Indonesia President's Cup, Persib was defeated by Tira Persikabo with a score of 1–2 at Si Jalak Harupat Stadium, Soreang. Tira Persikabo's goal was scored by Osas Saha at minute 28' and 70' while Persib's goal scored by Kim Jeffrey Kurniawan at minute 48'.

Results

Statistics

Supporters

Persib

Persib has a fanatical supporter named Bobotoh. Bobotoh comes from Sundanese which means "supporter". Bobotoh has several sub-supporters, namely Flower City Casual (FCC), Viking Persib Club (VPC), La Curva Pasundan, Bomber and others.
 
Bobotoh spread evenly in almost all regions West Java even has quite a lot of members outside West Java. In fact, one of Bobotoh's sub-supporters, namely Viking Persib Club, is one of the groups of supporters with the most members in Indonesia.
 
Bobotoh is known to be quite loyal and militant in supporting Persib. In the final match Perserikatan between Persib and PSMS Medan at the Gelora Bung Karno Stadium it was even attended by 150,000 spectators, most of whom were Bobotoh.

Persikabo
Kabomania and UPCS are a group of supporters who support Persikabo. The distribution of Persikabo supporter groups is only spread in the areas of Bogor Regency, Bogor City, and partly Depok City.
 
Persikabo's popularity, which is less well known in Indonesian football, is also one of the factors for some Bogor residents who support the team Persija Jakarta or Persib Bandung which is already famous in Indonesia.
 
Kabomania itself was founded in 2007 when Persikabo was still competing in the Indonesian League First Division. Kabomania is currently chaired by Heri Khaeruman who replaced the previous chairman, Muhammad Yusuf Kiat.
 
UPCS or the abbreviation of Ultras Persikabo Curva Sud are Persikabo supporters who are ultras culture, it is a culture that originates from Italy. UPCS itself occupies the south stand at Pakansari Stadium or Persikabo Stadium.

Clashes
The feud between Persib and Persikabo supporters actually only occurred in the Indonesian League era and what happens is usually a small or medium scale clash.

2019 Si Jalak Harupat
In the Persib match against Tira Persikabo in the continuation of 2019 Liga 1 at the Si Jalak Harupat Stadium, there was a clash between Bobotoh and Kabomania. As a result, hundreds of Kabomania were injured as a result of getting violent actions from Bobotoh elements when the game entered the last minute of the 2nd half.
 
The attack started with racist shouts from Bobotoh elements in the second west tribune. The majority of victims from Kabomania were dominated by women, many being hit and kicked.

2019 Pakansari
Riots happen again in 2019 Liga 1, Tira Persikabo's home match against Persib which took place at Pakansari Stadium, Cibinong, Bogor Regency, on September 14, 2019 was marked by riots between supporters inside and outside the stadium.
 
Before the match, Bobotoh and Vikings appealed to fellow citizens West Java to support Persib, but this invitation was ignored by Kabomania, a Persikabo supporter. Mutual ridicule occurred until the throwing of stones and chairs occurred which spread to the vandalism of public facilities in Pakansari.

Notes

References

Persib Bandung
Persikabo 1973
Football rivalries in Indonesia
Football in Indonesia
Liga 1 (Indonesia)
West Java